Hadlock Pond, also known as Lake Hadlock or Sunderland Pond, is a small man-made reservoir formed on a tributary of Halfway Creek in the Town of Fort Ann in Washington County, New York, United States.

Constructed in 1896, the original dam was of earthen construction, or rock fill. The dam was reconstructed in 2005, only to collapse months later, flooding and damaging nearby property.

The pond is owned by the town of Fort Ann, and is primarily used for recreational purposes.

Fishing
Fish species in the lake include northern pike, white sucker, brown bullhead, rock bass, pumpkinseed sunfish, bluegill, smallmouth bass, largemouth bass, carp, and yellow perch. This is a private lake in the Adirondacks and you must own property on the lake to access.

References

Reservoirs in Washington County, New York
Tourist attractions in Washington County, New York
Reservoirs in New York (state)
Lakes of Washington County, New York
Lakes of New York (state)